David John Semenko (July 12, 1957 – June 29, 2017) was a Canadian professional ice hockey player, coach, scout and colour commentator. During his National Hockey League (NHL) career, Semenko played for the Edmonton Oilers, Hartford Whalers and Toronto Maple Leafs as an enforcer. During his tenure with Edmonton, he notably protected Wayne Gretzky as an "on-ice bodyguard" during Gretzky's early career. Semenko won two Stanley Cups with the Oilers in 1984 and 1985. He was also the last player to score a goal in the World Hockey Association (WHA) before it folded and merged with the NHL.

Following his retirement as a player, he became a radio commentator of Oilers' games. Semenko died on June 29, 2017, from liver and pancreatic cancer.

Career 
Semenko played junior hockey for the Brandon Wheat Kings. He was originally selected 25th overall in 1977 by the Minnesota North Stars of the NHL and the Houston Aeros of the World Hockey Association (WHA).

The Aeros traded Semenko to the Oilers just before their 1977–78 season. He spent his first two professional years as a member of the Oilers in the WHA before the NHL–WHA merger. He scored the final goal in WHA history in Game 6 of the 1979 Avco Cup finals, which the Oilers lost to the Winnipeg Jets.

When the Oilers joined the NHL, Semenko's rights were retained by the North Stars. The Oilers traded their second-and third-round draft picks in the 1979 NHL Entry Draft to acquire his rights from the North Stars, who then drafted future United States Hockey Hall of Famer Neal Broten. The trade also gave the Oilers a third round pick, which was used to select future Oilers superstar and Hockey Hall of Famer Mark Messier.

An acknowledged enforcer, Semenko was Wayne Gretzky's "on-ice bodyguard" early in Gretzky's career in Edmonton, beginning in the WHA in 1978 and ending when Semenko was traded to the Hartford Whalers in 1986. Semenko is considered one of the toughest players ever in the NHL. After Gretzky won a car for being chosen as the MVP of the 1983 NHL All-Star game, he gifted the car to Semenko to show his appreciation for his on-ice work.

Semenko fought boxing legend Muhammad Ali in an exhibition on June 12, 1983. The match was officially a draw after going three rounds, but the Associated Press reported Ali was not seriously trying and was just toying with Semenko.

After brief stops with the Hartford Whalers and Toronto Maple Leafs, Semenko retired following the 1987–88 season. He finished his 575-game NHL career with 65 goals, 153 points and 1,175 penalty minutes. Semenko also recorded 70 fights over his career.

Retirement and death 
After retiring, Semenko became a colour commentator on Oilers radio broadcasts and was an assistant coach with the Oilers during the 1996–97 season. He also served as a professional scout for the team from 1997 until 2015.

Semenko died on June 29, 2017, at the age of 59, shortly after being diagnosed with liver and pancreatic cancer. His funeral was held at Rogers Place in Edmonton, which was open for the public to attend.

Career statistics

Awards and achievements 
2x Stanley Cup Championships (1984 & 1985)
"Honoured Member" of the Manitoba Hockey Hall of Fame
Earned the nickname "Sammy" or Semenk by his fans; known as "Cement Head" among rival fans
Published an autobiography in 1989 titled Looking Out for Number One.

Exhibition boxing record

References

External links 
 
 Profile at hockeydraftcentral.com

1957 births
2017 deaths
Brandon Travellers players
Brandon Wheat Kings players
Canadian ice hockey coaches
Canadian ice hockey left wingers
Canadian people of Ukrainian descent
Deaths from cancer in Alberta
Deaths from liver cancer
Deaths from pancreatic cancer
Edmonton Oilers (WHA) players
Edmonton Oilers announcers
Edmonton Oilers coaches
Edmonton Oilers players
Edmonton Oilers scouts
Hartford Whalers players
Houston Aeros draft picks
Minnesota North Stars draft picks
Ice hockey people from Winnipeg
Stanley Cup champions
Toronto Maple Leafs players
Wichita Wind players